Mitchell House is a historic home located at Elkton, Cecil County, Maryland.  It is a -story, side passage townhouse built between 1769 and 1781, by Dr. Abraham Mitchell, a physician from Lancaster County, Pennsylvania. It shows fine original detail characteristic of both the early and later periods of the Georgian style.

It was listed on the National Register of Historic Places in 1976.

References

External links
, including photo from 1985, Maryland Historical Trust

Elkton, Maryland
Houses on the National Register of Historic Places in Maryland
Houses in Cecil County, Maryland
Houses completed in 1769
Georgian architecture in Maryland
National Register of Historic Places in Cecil County, Maryland